Salvia scapiformis is an herb that is native to several provinces in China, along with Taiwan and the Philippines, growing at  elevation.

There are three named varieties, with slight variations in leaves, verticillasters, and calyx:
S.  scapiformis var. scapiformis
S.  carphocalyx var. pteridifolia
S.  nanchuanensis var. hirsuta

References

scapiformis
Flora of China